Barry McKenzie Holds His Own is the 1974 sequel to the 1972 Australian comedy film The Adventures of Barry McKenzie.

Returning from the original film is Barry Crocker in the title role, as well as Barry Humphries in the role of Barry's aunt, Edna. Also returning in the director's chair is Bruce Beresford. The then Prime Minister of Australia, Gough Whitlam, along with his wife Margaret Whitlam, made cameo appearances as themselves.

Barry Humphries contends that Barry McKenzie was an inspiration for the later film Crocodile Dundee.

Plot
The film continues directly where The Adventures of Barry McKenzie ended with Barry McKenzie (Barry Crocker) and his aunt Edna returning home to Australia from England.

During the flight two henchmen of Count Plasma (Donald Pleasence) (a Dracula-type Minister of Culture from the People's Republic of Transylvania) mistake Edna for the Queen of the United Kingdom and kidnap her during their brief stopover in Paris, believing that she will draw tourists to their country.

It is then up to Barry, his identical twin brother the Reverend Kevin McKenzie, his Parisian expatriate Aussie friend "Col the Frog" (Dick Bentley) and his other expatriate mates in France and England to head a team of Australian agents to be parachuted into Transylvania and rescue Edna.

Barry and Edna return home to Australia and are greeted by Gough Whitlam and his wife. Whitlam makes Edna a dame.

Cast
Barry Crocker as Barry McKenzie/Kevin McKenzie
Barry Humphries as Senator Douglas Manton/Edna Everage/Meyer de Lamphrey/buck-toothed Englishman
Donald Pleasence as Count Plasma
Dick Bentley as Col "The Frog" Lucas
Ed Devereaux as Sir Alec Ferguson
Roy Kinnear as Bishop of Paris
Don Spencer as quizmaster
Frank Windsor as police sergeant
Derek Guyler as police constable
Arthur English as cockney spiv
Desmond Tester as Marcel Escargot
John Le Mesurier as Robert Crowther
Tommy Trinder as Arthur McKenzie
Chantal Contouri as Zizi
Clive James as Paddy

Production
Bruce Beresford wanted to make a film of The Getting of Wisdom but was unable to raise finance. The movie was entirely funded by Reg Grundy. Shooting began in February 1974. Most of the film was shot on location in England, Wales and Paris, with some studio scenes shot in London. Edna's home movie footage was shot at Palm Beach, Sydney, in December 1973. British unions constantly objected to Australian cast and crew working in Britain.

Box office
 Barry McKenzie Holds His Own grossed $1,407,000 at the box office in Australia, which is equivalent to $9,497,250
in 2009 dollars.

References

External links
 
 Barry McKenzie Holds His Own at the National Film and Sound Archive
 Barry McKenzie fanpage
Barry McKenzie Holds His Own at Oz Movies

1974 comedy films
Australian comedy films
Films directed by Bruce Beresford
Films scored by Peter Best (composer)
1974 films
Films based on Australian comics
Live-action films based on comics
1970s English-language films